Public holidays in South Korea  each belong to one or more of three categories: 
National day
National flag raising day
Public holiday
Each category has a different legal basis. All national days are also flag raising days.

List of public holidays in South Korea

National celebration days

These days celebrate events considered joyous to Korea. In the beginning, Independence Declaration Day (March 1) was first stipulated in 1946. After the establishment of the Government of the Republic of Korea in 1948, four major National Celebration Days (Independence Declaration Day, Constitution Day, Liberation Day, National Foundation Day) were provided by "The Law Concerning the National Celebration Days" (국경일에관한법률) in 1949. 
In 2005, Hangul Day became the 5th National Celebration day.

National flag raising days

All the National Celebration Days, Memorial Day (half staff), Armed Forces Day are provided by Article 8 of the "National Flag Law" (대한민국국기법 제8조). On these days, the raising of the taegukgi at every house and along every roadside is promoted.

Public days off

They are provided by the "Regulations on Holidays of Public Agencies" (관공서의 공휴일에 관한 규정) This Regulation originally applied only to government and public offices, but most individual business offices also follow it.

Dates in solar calendar of Lunar New Year's Day, Buddha's Birthday, and Chuseok

See also

Culture of Korea
Culture of South Korea
Culture of North Korea
Festivals of Korea
Korean calendar
Lunar Month
Public holidays in North Korea

References

External links 
Korean public holidays - history and search by year.
Korean public holidays - Korea Tourism Organization

 
Holidays
South Korean culture
Korea, South